Rory Sutherland may refer to:

Rory Sutherland (advertising executive) (born 1965), British advertising executive
Rory Sutherland (cyclist) (born 1982), Australian cyclist
Rory Sutherland (rugby union) (born 1994), Scottish rugby player